Philip ΙΙ of Montfort (died 24 September 1270) was a French nobleman, Count of Squillace in Italy from 1266/68, then Lord of Castres in 1270. He was the son of Philip I of Monfort, Lord of Tyre and Eleonore of Courtenay. His coat-of-arms was Gules, a lion rampant double queued argent, a label of four points azure (or ... rampant queue forche ...).

Biography

He joined the expedition of Charles of Anjou to conquer the Kingdom of Sicily, and he shared command of the first battalion at the Battle of Benevento with Hugh of Mirepoix. After Benevento, he was given command of forces to protect the Papal States. He led the Angevin troops into the island of Sicily, and put down the revolt that resulted in the sacking of Augusta.

On his father’s death in March 1270, he succeeded to his French seigneury of Castres, but his father's possessions in Outremer had been granted to his half-brother John of Montfort. He joined the Eighth Crusade and died in Tunis.

Family

He married Jeanne de Lévis-Mirepoix († 30 June 1284), daughter of Guy I de Lévis, Lord of Mirepoix and Guibourge of Montfort and had three children:
 John of Montfort, Count of Squillace (d. bef. December 1300), married firstly Isabella Maletta, married secondly Giovanna di Fasanella, married thirdly in 1273 Marguerite of Beaumont (d. March 1307, Marseilles)
 Laure of Montfort (d. bef. December 1300), married Bernard VII of Comminges
 Eleonore of Montfort (d. aft. May 1338), married before February 1302 John V of Vendôme
 Jeanne of Montfort (d. 1300), married firstly 1268 Guy VI of Forez (19 January 1278), married secondly 1278 Louis I of Savoy, Baron de Vaud (d. aft. 1302).

See also
Charles I of Sicily
Eighth Crusade
Philip of Montfort, Lord of Tyre

Ancestry

References

Sources

External links
Coat of Arms in the Wijnbergen Roll

1270 deaths
Christians of the Eighth Crusade
Philip
Year of birth unknown
Charles I of Anjou
Counts of Squillace